The Newcastle Art Gallery (formerly the Newcastle City Art Gallery, Newcastle Region Art Gallery) is a large, public art museum in Newcastle, New South Wales, Australia.

History 
Founded in 1945 with an art collection consisting of 123 works donated by Roland Pope which was conditional on the construction of a gallery to hold it, the museum opened its doors in 1957 and moved to a new, purpose-built museum building in 1977. As a Sydneysider, Pope's collection reflect was Sydney centric. Under the directorships of the gallery's first two directors Gil Docking and David Thomas, both from Melbourne, saw the collection expand to include artists from Melbourne and Adelaide.

A purpose built building was completed in the 1970s and officially opened by Queen Elizabeth II on Friday 11 March 1977. This building stands today as an example of 1970s geometric architecture in the brutalist tradition.

Collection 
The Newcastle Art Gallery collection represents an overview of Australian art from colonial times to the present day and includes various media, such as, paintings, works on paper, photography and sculpture. The collection scope includes several important Indigenous barks and poles as well as a substantial collection of contemporary Indigenous art. Newcastle Art Gallery holds the largest collection of modern Japanese ceramics in the southern hemisphere.

Ceramics 
Newcastle Art Gallery has a significant collection of Australian and Japanese ceramics. This collection encompasses the leading ceramists; Les Blakebrough, Louise Boscacci, Penny Byrne, Pippin Drysdale, Marea Gazzard, Victor Greenaway, Gwyn Hanssen Pigott, Col Levy, Jenny Orchard, Peter Rushforth and Bernard Sahm.

Japanese ceramics 
The Japanese collection encompasses both Mingei 'folk art' and Sodeisha 'crawling through mud association' - avant garde non-functional ware. This collection encompasses the leading  Japanese ceramists; Shôji Hamada, Takeichi Kawai, Kanjirô Kawai and Kentichi Tomimoto.

Sculpture 
Three-dimensional art work in the collection encompass a diverse range of materials including marble, steel, spinifex grass, wood, ceramic, glass, feathers, engines and many other source materials. Artists represented by sculptures in the collection include Karl Duldig, Robert Klippel, Clement Meadmore, Margel Hinder, Akio Makigawa, Kathleen Shillam, Hossein Valamanesh, Rosalie Gascoigne, Fiona Hall and Patricia Piccinini.

Iconic Australian artist Brett Whiteley is represented by several art works including the large scale Black Totem II which is located near the entrance of the gallery.

Prints and drawings 
Newcastle Art Gallery holds a significant collection of prints and drawings. Notable drawings from George Lambert, Godfrey Miller, Rah Fizelle and John Passmore are represented in the collection. The print collection includes colonial era material such as Richard Browne engravings and work by  S. T. Gill, Eugène von Guérard, Walter Preston and Joseph Lycett. The collection includes complete suites, series and folios by artists such as, Arthur Boyd, John Coburn, Imants Tillers, Jesse Traill, George Baldessin, Bea Maddock, Mike Parr, Margaret Preston, Thea Procter, Jan Senbergs and Salvatore Zofrea.

Photography 
Photography is represented by some of Australia's leading contemporary artists including Jane Burton, Destiny Deacon, Fiona Hall, Bill Henson, Rosemary Laing, Julie Rrap, Darren Siwes and Robyn Stacey.

Painting 

Newcastle Art Gallery holds one of the most significant collection of paintings in Australia. This collection spans colonial work by Joseph Lycett, Australian Impressionists such as, Arthur Streeton, Hans Heysen, Elioth Grüner, Sydney Long and Lloyd Rees through to the leading twentieth-century modernists such as, Newcastle-born William Dobell and other modernists Grace Cossington Smith, Arthur Boyd, Sidney Nolan, Robert Dickerson, Charles Blackman. Newcastle born artists Jon Molvig and John Olsen are represented.

Video and new media 
An area of growth within the collection is new media and video art. Shaun Gladwell and TV Moore and Tracey Moffatt are represented in this collection.

International art 
While the Newcastle Art Galley's collection is focused primarily on Australian art, the collection has some significant work from international artists. Renowned American minimalist Carl Andre gifted Steel  16  (pronounced steel sum 16) to the gallery in 2011. Made from 136 hot-rolled steel plates, each 30cm x 30cm x 1cm, this work is important to the collection because of its connection to the city of Newcastle. Andre made the work while in Newcastle in 1978 at the now close BHP.

Key artists 

Arthur Boyd, David Boyd, Rupert Bunny, Judy Cassab, Grace Cossington Smith, John Coburn, William Dobell, Karl Duldig, Donald Friend, Bill Henson, Joy Hester, Emily Kame Kngwarreye, Tracey Moffatt, Margaret Olley, John Olsen, Patricia Piccinini, Gwyn Hanssen Pigott, Margaret Preston, Lloyd Rees, Brian Robinson, Alex Seton, Ken Thaiday Snr, Brett Whiteley, Michael Zavros.

Redevelopment plans 
The City of Newcastle together with Newcastle Art Gallery continue to advocate and plan for an extension to the current gallery, with the aim to expand the overall exhibition space by 250% and allowed for more of the 7000 items in the collection to be more accessible to the public. The $40million expansion requires the art gallery to be closed for 2 years.

Benefaction 
During her lifetime, Sydney based artist Margaret Olley donated over 46 art works to Newcastle Art Gallery from artists such as, Robert Barnes, Cressida Campbell, Ray Crooke, Margaret Cilento, Lawrence Daws, Vicki Glazier, Nicholas Harding, Ben Quilty and Craig Waddell.
Dr William Bowmore, a Newcastle resident, is responsible for some of Newcastle Art Gallery's international works of art including work by Jules Dalou, Jacob Epstein, Henri Gaudier-Brzeska and Auguste Rodin. Bowmore also donated Brett Whiteley's 1978 Wynne prize winning painting  Summer at Carcoar. John Olsen's  The sea sun of 5 bells, 1964, was donated by Ann Lewis AO following her death; it had previously hung in her dining room from the ceiling for 45 years.

Newcastle Art Gallery Foundation 
Newcastle Art Gallery is supported by the Newcastle Art Gallery Foundation which is not for profit charity. Since 1978 the foundation has helped to raise millions of dollars for the gallery, particularly for the acquisition of art work.

References

Sources

External links
 

Art museums and galleries in New South Wales
Tourist attractions in Newcastle, New South Wales
Art gallery